The International School of Bergen is an international school in Bergen, Norway. It caters for primary school to upper school level.

History and programs 
The International School of Bergen, founded in 1975, is a non-profit, co-educational day school that has been accredited since 1985 by the European Council of International Schools and the New England Association of Schools and Colleges, and is governed by a democratically elected Board of Trustees. The school provides an English language education, based on US/UK models, for children of expatriate families as well as local residents of the Bergen community. It offers the International Baccalaureate programs applicable to its current age range (IB Primary Years Program and IB Middle Years Program). It no longer offers the IB Diploma Program.

Staff and enrollment  
As of 2022, the school has 52 employees in total, of whom 35 are teachers. Approximately 40% of the teaching staff is British, 30% American and 30% are from other countries, including China, Chile, India, Poland, France and Norway.  At any one time about 245 children from approximately thirty nations are enrolled. The countries with the largest representation in the student body are UK, USA, India and Norway. The school's educational program has been designed to meet the needs of its international student body.

Facilities and location  
The facilities include a library with an integrated media center, a gymnasium, a computer room, art and music rooms and science laboratory. Nearby swimming and ice-skating facilities are also used.

External links 

International School of Bergen website

Schools in Bergen
International Baccalaureate schools in Norway
Secondary schools in Norway
Primary schools in Norway
International schools in Norway
Educational institutions established in 1975
1975 establishments in Norway